Volapük ("Language of the World", or lit. "World Speak") is a constructed language created between 1879 and 1880 by Johann Martin Schleyer, a Catholic priest in Baden, Germany, who believed that God had told him in a dream to create an international language. Notable as the first major constructed international auxiliary language, the grammar comes from European languages and the vocabulary mostly from English (with some German and French). However, the roots are often distorted beyond recognition.

Volapük conventions took place in 1884 (Friedrichshafen), 1887 (Munich) and 1889 (Paris). The first two conventions used German, and the last conference used only Volapük. By 1889, there were an estimated 283 clubs, 25 periodicals in or about Volapük, and 316 textbooks in 25 languages; at that time the language claimed nearly a million adherents. However, Volapük was largely displaced between the late 19th and early 20th century by Esperanto.

History

Schleyer first published a sketch of Volapük in May 1879 in Sionsharfe, a Catholic poetry magazine of which he was editor.  This was followed in 1880 by a full-length book in German. Schleyer himself did not write books on Volapük in other languages, but other authors soon did.

André Cherpillod writes of the third Volapük convention,

The Dutch cryptographer Auguste Kerckhoffs was for a number of years Director of the Academy of Volapük, and introduced the movement to several countries.
The French Association for the Propagation of Volapük was authorized on 8 April 1886, with A. Lourdelet as president and a central committee that included the deputy Edgar Raoul-Duval.
However, tensions arose between Kerckhoffs and others in the Academy, who wanted reforms made to the language, and Schleyer, who insisted strongly on retaining his proprietary rights. This led to schism, with much of the Academy abandoning Schleyer's Volapük in favor of Idiom Neutral and other new constructed language projects. Another reason for the decline of Volapük may have been the rise of Esperanto. In 1887 the first Esperanto book (Unua Libro) was published. Many Volapük clubs became Esperanto clubs.

By 1890 the movement was in disarray, with violent arguments among the members. Schleyer resigned from the Volapük Academy and created a rival academy. Derived languages such as Nal Bino, Balta, Bopal, Spelin, Dil and Orba were invented and quickly forgotten.

In the 1920s, Arie de Jong, with the consent of the leaders of the small remnant of Volapük speakers, made a revision of Volapük which was published in 1931 (now called Volapük Nulik "New Volapük" as opposed to the Volapük Rigik 'Original Volapük' of Schleyer). This revision was accepted by the few speakers of the language. De Jong simplified the grammar, eliminating some rarely used verb forms, and eliminated some gendered pronouns and gendered verb endings. He also rehabilitated the phoneme  and used it to make some morphemes more recognizable. For instance, lömib "rain" became rein.
Volapük enjoyed a brief renewal of popularity in the Netherlands and Germany under de Jong's leadership, but was suppressed (along with other constructed languages) in countries under Nazi rule and never recovered.

Regarding the success of this artificial language, the Spanish scientist Santiago Ramón y Cajal wrote in the first edition of his Tonics of Willingness, in 1898:

However, some years later (1920), in the third edition of the same book, he added the following footnote to the former assertion: "As it was presumable, nowadays -1920-, the brand new Volapük has been forgotten definitively. We forecast the same for Esperanto."

Large Volapük collections are held by the International Esperanto Museum in Vienna, Austria; the Center for Documentation and Study about the International Language in La Chaux-de-Fonds, Switzerland; and the American Philosophical Society in Philadelphia, Pennsylvania.
In 2000 there were an estimated 20 Volapük speakers in the world.

In December 2007 it was reported that the Volapük version of Wikipedia had recently jumped to 15th place among language editions, with more than 112,000 articles.
A few months earlier there had been only 797 articles. The massive increase in the size of "Vükiped", bringing it ahead of the Esperanto Wikipedia, was due to an enthusiast who had used a computer program to automatically create geographical articles, many on small villages. The motive was to gain visibility for the language.
By March 2013 the Esperanto Wikipedia, with a very active user community, had risen to 176,792 articles, while the Volapük Wikipedia had at that point 119,091 articles.

There has been a continuous Volapük speaker community since Schleyer's time, with an unbroken succession of Cifals (leaders).  These were:
 Johann Martin Schleyer 1879–1912
 Albert Sleumer 1912–1948
 Arie de Jong (provisionally) 1947–1948, 1951–1957
 Jakob Sprenger  1948–1950
 Johann Schmidt 1950–1977
 Johann Krüger 1977–1983
 Brian Bishop 1984–2014
 Hermann Philipps 2014–present

Orthography and pronunciation

The alphabet is as follows:

That is, the vowel letters ä, ö, ü have the pronunciations they do in German, roughly like English end, fern, über. C is pronounced like English j or ch, and j like English sh, or like the s in English "usually".  is pronounced  after voiced consonants, for example bs, ds, gs, ls, as plural -s is in English. R was not found in the original proposal.

The letters ä, ö, and ü do not have alternative forms such as the ae, oe, and ue of German, but Schleyer proposed alternate forms ꞛ, ꞝ, and ꞟ for them, all of which are part of Unicode since version 7.0 released in June 2014:
 
 
 
 
 
 

There are no diphthongs; each vowel letter is pronounced separately.

Special consonantal letters
The author Alfred A. Post mentions in his Comprehensive Volapük Grammar some additional letters created by Schleyer:

And the following letters are constructed by the inventor to designate sounds which occasionally occur –

Letter r

Schleyer's 1880 Volapük as well as Modern Volapük has minimal l–r pairs such as rel "religion" versus lel "iron".

Stress
Polysyllabic words are always stressed on the final vowel; for example, neai "never" is pronounced . Exceptionally, the question clitic "-li" does not shift the stress of the word it attaches to. When words are compounded together, secondary stress is retained on the final syllables of the compounded elements, as long as that doesn't result in adjacent stressed syllables.

Vocabulary
Schleyer adapted the vocabulary mostly from English, with a smattering of German and French.  Some words  remain readily recognizable for a speaker of one of the source languages, but many others are modified beyond easy recognition. For instance, vol and pük are derived from the English words world and speak. Although unimportant linguistically, and regardless of the simplicity and consistency of the stress rule, these deformations were greatly mocked by the language's detractors. It seems to have been Schleyer's intention, however, to alter its loan words in such a way that they would be hard to recognise, thus losing their ties to the languages (and, by extension, nations) from which they came. Conversely, Esperanto and Interlingua are commonly criticized as being much easier to learn for Europeans than for those with non-European native languages.

Grammar
The grammar is based on that of typical European languages, but with an agglutinative character: grammatical inflections are indicated by stringing together separate affixes for each element of meaning.

Nouns
Nouns inflect for case and number, but not for gender.

The following is the declension of the Volapük word vol "world":

As in German, the Volapük noun has four cases: nominative, genitive, dative and accusative. In compound words, the first part of the compound is usually separated from the second by the genitive termination -a, e.g. Vola-pük, "of-world language": "language of the world".  However, the other case endings (-e dative, -i accusative) are sometimes used if applicable, or the roots may be agglutinated in the nominative, with no separating vowel.

Adjectives and adverbs
Adjectives, formed by the suffix -ik, normally follow the noun they qualify.  They do not agree with the noun in number and case in that position, but do if they precede the noun, are separated from it by intervening words, or stand alone.  Adverbs are formed by suffixing -o, either to the root or to the adjectival -ik (gudik "good", gudiko "well"); they normally follow the verb or adjective they modify.

Pronouns
The pronouns begin with o-. In the singular, they are ob "I", ol "thou", om "he/it", of "she", os (impersonal), on "one", ok "oneself". They are pluralized with -s: obs "we", ols "ye", oms  "they". The possessive may be formed with either the genitive -a or with adjectival -ik: oba or obik "my". Prepositions, conjunctions and interjections are also formed from noun roots by appending appropriate suffixes. In later, reformed Volapük, om was narrowed down to males only, whereas on got the meaning of 'it' as well as impersonal 'they'.

Verbs
The verb carries a fine degree of detail, with morphemes marking tense, aspect, voice, person, number and (in the third person) the subject's gender. However, many of these categories are optional, and a verb can stand in an unmarked state. A Volapük verb can be conjugated in 1,584 ways (including infinitives and reflexives).

Person
For the simple present, the pronouns are suffixed to the verb stem:
binob I am, binol thou art,
etc. The present passive takes the prefix pa-:
palöfons they are loved.

Tense, aspect, and voice
The three tenses in the indicative, and the three perfect aspects, each take a characteristic vowel prefix:

The present-tense prefix is omitted in the active voice, so:
binob I am, äbinol you were, ebinom he has been, ibinof she had been, obinos it will be, ubinon one will have been.

For example, from del 'day',
adelo today, odelo tomorrow, udelo the day after tomorrow, ädelo yesterday, edelo the day before yesterday, idelo three days ago.

The passive voice is formed with p-, and here the a is required for the present tense:
palöfob I am loved, pälogol you were seen, pologobs we will be seen.

Infinitive mood
The infinitive is formed with the suffix -ön.  It can be combined with tense/aspect prefixes:
Logön to see, elogön to have seen.

Interrogative mood
Yes–no questions are indicated with the particle li:
Pälogom-li was he seen?
The hyphen indicates that the syllable li does not take stress. It occurs before the verb to avoid a sequence of three consonants or a double el:  li-pälogol?  li-binoms?

Participles and the habitual aspect
Participles, both active and passive, are formed in -öl:
Logöl seeing, elogöl having seen, ologöl being about to see, palogöl seen (being seen), pelogöl seen (having been seen), pologöl about to be seen.
Binob penöl is literally 'I am writing', though penob is also used.  For "I write" as habitual action, the habitual aspect is used.  This is formed by adding -i- after the tense prefix, and here again the present-tense a- is required. The forms are thus active ai-, äi-, ei-, ii-, oi-, ui-, passive pai-, päi-, pei-, pii-, poi-, pui-.  All are pronounced as two syllables.
Aifidob bodi I eat bread (as a daily occurrence), äipenob penedis I used to write letters.
With temporal words,
aidelo daily (at the present time)

The imperative moods
The imperative -öd follows the person suffix:
Gololöd! Go! (to one person), gololsöd! go! (to more than one person)

Optative -ös is used for courteous requests, and jussive -öz an emphatic command.

Conditional mood
Conditionals are formed with -la for the protasis (if-clause) and -öv for the apodosis (then-clause):
 If äbinob-la liegik, äbinoböv givik – if I were rich I would be generous.
 Ibinomöv givik, if ibinom-la liegik – he would have been generous if he had been rich.

Note that the tense changes as well, so that in the first example the past tense is used even though the present tense is intended. Like the question particle, the -la is written with a hyphen to indicate that it is not stressed in speech.

Potential mood
A potential mood is formed with -öx:
Pelomöx he might pay.

Reflexive verbs
Reflexive forms are made from the active voice and the pronoun ok:
Vatükob I wash, vatükobok (or  vatükob obi) I wash myself.
In the third person, the periphrastic form of vatükomok (he washes himself) must use the reflexive pronoun, vatükom oki, as vatükom omi would mean "he washes him (someone else)".

The plural -s may precede or follow the reflexive, as the speaker chooses:
vatükomoks or vatükomsok they wash themselves.
Here there is a meaningful distinction between joining the pronoun to the verb, and inflecting it independently:
Löfobsok we love ourselves, löfobs obis we love each other.

Gerundive
The gerundive arguments are active ö-, passive pö-.

Examples

The Lord's Prayer

Usage as common noun
The word Volapük or a variation thereof means "nonsense, gibberish" in certain languages, such as Danish volapyk and Esperanto volapukaĵo. In Russian, the term Volapuk encoding refers to writing Cyrillic letters with the Latin alphabet based on what they look like, for example writing  instead of волапюк.

See also

Kosmopolan
Volapük Wikipedia
Esperanto
Ido
Interlingua

References

External links

 The Volapük-language Wikipedia's page on Volapük
 A Volapük portal, with links to grammar, vocabulary, exercises etc

 Description and history of the Volapük Academy
 Links to sundry background materials

Summaries
  Chapter on Volapük in Otto Jespersen's pro Novial An International Language (1928)
 
 Volapuk  at the Conlang Atlas of Language Structures.

Tutorials

 (First of) a ten-lesson course in modern Volapük  (Follow the 'next' link at the foot of each page for each succeeding lesson...)

Handbooks, grammars and dictionaries

 Ralph Midgley's web-page - grammar, lessons, vocabulary, examples
 Malgranda gramatiko de Volapuko per Esperanto by the ex-Cifal Brian Bishop (2015) - Volapük Nulik

  Volapük to English dictionary
  English to Volapük dictionary
  Charles Sprague's Grammar of Volapük, 1888

Fictional treatments
 .  Reprinted 2019  (Amazon)

 
1879 introductions
Constructed languages
Endangered languages
Agglutinative languages
International auxiliary languages
International auxiliary languages introduced in the 1880s